101 Park Avenue is a building in Oklahoma City, Oklahoma. It was formerly known as the Skirvin Tower, built in 1932 as a luxury apartment-hotel annex to the Skirvin Hotel.

History
Crews broke ground on the Skirvin Tower in March 1931.  Work continued until suddenly in January 1932 when William Balser Skirvin ran out of funds for the project.  Work was halted until 1934, and completed in 1938.

In 1974, the building was remodeled into a glass-enclosed office building.

Architecture
The building is an example of Modern architecture, and specifically International Style, characterized by its rectangular form, horizontal lines, and use of steel.

See also
List of tallest buildings in Oklahoma City

References

Skyscraper office buildings in Oklahoma City
Office buildings completed in 1936